Meital Slominsky (born 16 December 1982), known by her stage name Mei Finegold, also credited as Mei Feingold, is an Israeli singer. Her third-place finish in Kokhav Nolad 7, Israel's version of Pop Idol, launched her career in 2009. Finegold represented Israel in the Eurovision Song Contest 2014.

Early life
Finegold was born in 1982 in Rishon LeZion, where she still lives today. Her musical career started in school ceremonies, and she continued by taking singing lessons and learning to sing classical songs. Since her childhood, Finegold used to throw many shows, including night clubs and bars. Since then, Finegold became the lead singer of a band called Disiac. The band participated in Hebrew Labor, a special CD containing covers of old Israeli songs.

Kokhav Nolad
Finegold's place in the show was promised since her first audition. The judges were charmed by her and not even a single piece of criticism was given to Finegold.

During the show Finegold kept on the rock line, covering songs mainly from Israel's mid-1980s. She was awarded the performance of the week for five times, two of them in a row. Finegold's performances were as follows:

Eurovision Song Contest 2014

In January it was revealed that Finegold had been internally selected by the Israeli broadcaster, IBA, to represent Israel in the Eurovision Song Contest 2014 to be held in Copenhagen, Denmark. It was announced on 5 March, that she would sing "Same Heart" for Israel. Finegold competed in the second semi-final of the competition, placing 14th and scoring 19 points, ultimately failing to qualify to the final.

References

External links 
 

1982 births
21st-century Israeli women singers
Articles containing video clips
Eurovision Song Contest entrants for Israel
Eurovision Song Contest entrants of 2014
Israeli people of Romanian-Jewish descent
Israeli rock singers
Kokhav Nolad contestants
Living people
People from Rishon LeZion